Bryomoia is a monotypic moth genus of the family Noctuidae. Its only species, Bryomoia melachlora, is found in south-eastern Siberia, Korea, Japan and Taiwan. Both the genus and species were first described by Staudinger in 1892.

References

Hadeninae
Monotypic moth genera